Robin L. Plackett (3 September 1920 – 23 June 2009) was a statistician best known for his contributions to the history of statistics and to experimental design, most notably the Plackett–Burman designs.

Early life and education 
Plackett attended Liverpool Collegiate School from 1932 to 1939. He then attended Clare College, Cambridge, where he graduated in 1942.

Early career 
During World War II, Plackett was requested to work for the Ministry of Supply, in SR17 which was a statistical branch. He began to develop a methodology for applying statistical knowledge, and would pass it down to new recruits.

First scientific paper 
In 1946, he would publish his first paper which was written jointly with Peter Burman in an journal called Biometrika. The paper, titled "The design of optimum multifactorial experiments", introduced Plackett–Burman experimental designs.

Academic career 
In 1947, he became a lecturer at Liverpool University. He would also publish research on the history of statistics. Then, in 1962, he took a short post for the Professor of Statistics at King's College, Durham before the college merged with Newcastle University in 1963.

He was the first professor of statistics at Newcastle University and held the post until his retirement in 1983. In 1987 the Royal Statistical Society awarded him the Guy Medal in Gold, having awarded him both the bronze and silver medals earlier in his career.

He authored several books on statistics, including  Principles of Regression Analysis  (1960), The Analysis of Categorical Data (1974) and  An Introduction to the Interpretation of Quantal Responses in Biology (1979, with P. S. Hewlett).

Personal life 
Plackett was said to have had a keen interest in climbing. He met his wife, Carol whom they have been married for 65 years. He also had three children: Adam, Jane and Martin.

References

Further reading
 

Academics of Newcastle University
English statisticians
1920 births
Fellows of the American Statistical Association
2009 deaths
Alumni of Clare College, Cambridge